Wodzeck is a 1984 West German drama film directed by Oliver Herbrich based on the 1837 play Woyzeck by Georg Büchner.  It was entered into the 14th Moscow International Film Festival. Detlef Kügow here received the "Award for best male actor" for his leading role in the film.

Plot
Franz Wodzeck is worker on a factory production line in the German rust belt region. He lives in a workmen's dwelling on the factory area. To Andres, his roommate, he reports about his fixed ideas, but even Andres cannot help him. His only relief is running out of doors to stroll about one of these decayed areas between civilization and nature. He seems to become a little quiet here.

Usually, his life is going on without any emotion. Leaving off working in the factory he meets Maleen, cashier in the stores. On an evening when she had no time for him he tries to participate on the pleasure seeking of the people. The hard work and the despair make Wodzeck suffering. He entrusts himself to  the  staffdoctor but  that  one  just  wants  to  preserve  Wodzeck's  working power. During a porno film show, some of his fellowworkmen call Wodzeck's attention on Maleen's new relations with the boss who had invited her for a dance on the workshop Christmas party. Wodzeck can't believe that. Nevertheless he goes to meet her. But Maleen isn't aware of breaking down his life when she tells him to want to enjoy her life.

Suddenly Wodzeck feels lonely and forsaken. In a taxi he rides the streets in the city, aimless and desperate. At night, he feels tormented by horrible dreams recalling his time in the mortuary. In great haste he puts on his clothes and runs out of the door. Without success he tries again to meet Maleen. Anxious, he is listening to imaginary voices. “What?  Even the wind is whispering that?” Wodzeck is horrified. In the evening he watches again Maleen dancing with her new friend. In the discotheque  the  stroboscope  flashes  seem  to  shatter  all  their  motions.  He feels every picture burned again in his brain.

Next morning, he has finished his outlook on life, he is hopeless.  He bequests all his effects to Andres who cannot help him. After all he buys in an ironmonger's shop the knife. Without looking anywhere he stabs Maleen to death. After that, he seems to recover his senses. When he realizes that he had killed what has been the most beloved being in his life, madness is overwhelming him.

He is apprehended walking round the street. On several psychological expert reports he is declared insane. After his installation in a psychiatric asylum, he further feels neither anxiety nor desire. He simply exists.

Reception 
Herbrich commissioned film composer Andreas Hofner to create some pop songs with German lyrics for the film – a task he only reluctantly accepted. The film was premiered at the 18th Hof International Film Festival in 1984.

Wodzeck was presented at 20 international film festivals. In Germany it was released by enfilm, Christian Meinke, who also appeared as the taxi driver in the film.  In 2017, the 35mm film was digitally remastered and re-released in the Fiction – Non-Fiction Film Edition.

Literature 
 Barbara Braam "Literarische Vorlage und filmische Aktualisierung. Zu O. Herbrichs Wodzeck", Aachen 1989 (Rheinisch Westfälische Technische Hochschule Aachen)
 Oliver Herbrich "Wodzeck - Drehbuch", 2018 (Fiction – Non-Fiction Film Edition) ISBN 978-3-00-058911-9

References

External links
 
 
Official Film website

1985 films
1985 drama films
1980s German-language films
German drama films
West German films
German films based on plays
Works based on Woyzeck
1980s German films